The Botanical Garden of Barcelona is a botanical garden in the Montjuïc hill of Barcelona set amongst a number of stadiums used in the Summer Olympic Games of 1992. Although a botanical garden had been established in Barcelona as early as 1888, the current gardens date from 1999. It should not be confused with the Historical Botanical Garden of Barcelona founded in 1930 and reopened in 2003, also located in Montjuïc. Both botanical gardens, the Historical Botanical Garden of Barcelona and the Botanical Garden of Barcelona, are administrated by the Botanical Institute of Barcelona, which is one of the four institutions that constitute the Museum of Natural Sciences of Barcelona.

The gardens specialize in plants and communities from those areas of the world with Mediterranean climates and is divided into areas representing the main areas. These are Australia, Chile, California, South Africa, the western Mediterranean area and the eastern Mediterranean area. A specific section is devoted to the flora of the Canary Islands.

External links 

 El Jardí Botànic de Barcelona
 Jardí Botànic de Barcelona (german)

Parks in Barcelona
Gardens in Catalonia
Botanical gardens in Spain